Dunstablians Rugby Union Football Club are an amateur rugby union club based in Bedfordshire, who play their rugby in Midlands 3 East (South), an eight tier league in the English rugby union system.  Their ground is located just outside nearby Houghton Regis and is commonly known as Bidwell Park. The club run two Senior teams and a full Mini & Junior section (catering for 5-15 year old players) and Academy teams (catering for 16-18 year old players).  Numerous local rivalries are shared, most notably with Stockwood Park and Luton Rugby Club.

History
In 1927, members of Dunstable Grammar School formed a rugby section, based at Fensomes Field in Leagrave, Luton. Unfortunately, the number of regular players dwindled, forcing the closure of the club after only three seasons.

In 1948, another group of former pupils made a new start, securing a ground at French's Avenue in Dunstable and later moving to Skimpot Lane in Luton. In 1954 ground in Bullpond Lane, Dunstable was leased. The event was marked with a match against an East Midlands Invitation XV.  It was eventually decided that a new ground was needed and the site at Bidwell Hill in Houghton Regis should be purchased, with the bulk of the financing raised through the sale of the Bullpond Lane site for housing development.

In September 1985, the club opened the current clubhouse by hosting an International XV that included six past England Captains.

The club has seen several promotions in the past. Highlights include the near perfect 1999/2000 season which delivered victory in all RFU competitions entered, along with League, County and East Midlands Cup success.  This culminated in Dunstablians becoming National Intermediate Cup Champions at Twickenham.

A successful period followed; Dunstablians retained the County Cup in 2000/01 and added the Colts Cup to the collection. They lifted the County Cup again in 2005. During 2006/07 Dunstablians also secured the Bedfordshire County Cup, defeating Bedford Athletic in the process. They then returned to Twickenham for their second Intermediate Cup Final losing 36–46 to Cornish side Mounts Bay and finished 3rd in Midlands League 1 (RFU Level 5), their highest ever league placing.

After a five-year wait, Dunstablians won the Beds County Cup again by defeating Stockwood Park in 2012, but since then have finished runners up in no less than three successive County Cup Finals.

Club Honours

1st XV:
Midlands East 2 champions: 1997–98
Midlands East 1 champions: 1999–00
Bedfordshire County Cup winners (5): 2000, 2001, 2005, 2007, 2012
East Midlands Cup winners: 2000
Midlands 2 East champions: 2000–01
Rugby World Magazine - Team of the Year: 2001
Bedfordshire Shield winners: 2019

Youth
Bedfordshire Colts County Cup winners: 2001

Current squad

International honours

Notes

References

External links
 Dunstablians Rugby Football Club
 Rugby Football Union

English rugby union teams
Rugby clubs established in 1948
Rugby union in Bedfordshire
Dunstable